Nikolaos Manolesos (born 1908, date of death unknown) was a Greek fencer. He competed in the individual and team foil and sabre events at the 1936 Summer Olympics.

References

1908 births
Year of death missing
Greek male fencers
Olympic fencers of Greece
Fencers at the 1936 Summer Olympics